Pierre Tolar (born 1898, date of death unknown) was a Luxembourgian gymnast. He competed in nine events at the 1924 Summer Olympics.

References

External links
 

1898 births
Year of death missing
Luxembourgian male artistic gymnasts
Olympic gymnasts of Luxembourg
Gymnasts at the 1924 Summer Olympics
Place of birth missing